Accrington Stanley, Who Are They? is a slogan that was used in an advert for milk, by the Milk Marketing Board in the 1980s, in the United Kingdom. The advert starred Carl Rice and Kevin Spaine.

Advert 
The advert features two young Liverpool F.C. fans. One tells the other that star Liverpool player Ian Rush had told him that if he didn't drink milk, he would only be good enough to play for Accrington Stanley. The other fan asks, “Accrington Stanley, who are they?”, to which the first replies, “Exactly.” According to Rice, Tottenham Hotspur were originally going to be named. However, Tottenham objected, so Accrington Stanley were chosen instead,  as they were a non-League team at the time, and were thought of as a more obscure team. David Lloyd, a non-executive director of Accrington Stanley, said in an interview in 2012 that the advert earned the club £10,000.

Reception 
The advert was popular, and was continually shown for up to six years, after it was originally made in 1989. The phrase was seen to make Accrington Stanley the subject of jokes up to the present day. However, residents of Accrington view the reference positively.

In March 2006, Rice was invited as the guest of honour to watch Accrington Stanley's match against Stevenage Borough, and was later invited to Accrington Stanley's last game of the season against Scarborough, as they were promoted to Football League Two. In September 2009, the programme on Sky Sports, Soccer AM promoted Accrington Stanley's “Save Our Stanley” campaign because of the phrase, as they wanted to continue to use it to refer to the club, when reading fixture lists.

A shot-for-shot remake advertising Black Cow Vodka, which is made from milk, began airing in September 2016, with a much older Rice reprising his role. The advert was banned from airing in March 2017, due to concerns that it targeted children, because of the connection to the original advert, and promoted excessive drinking.

In February 2023, Spaine was given a life sentence with a minimum term of 18 years for murder, with his role in the advertisement featuring prominently in reporting on his trial and sentencing.

References 

British television commercials
British advertising slogans
Accrington Stanley F.C.
Association football culture
Dairy farming in the United Kingdom
1980s in British television
1989 neologisms
Dairy marketing